Terence Oliver Blanchard (born March 13, 1962) is an American trumpeter and composer. He started his career in 1982 as a member of the Lionel Hampton Orchestra, then The Jazz Messengers. He has composed more than forty film scores and performed on more than fifty. A frequent collaborator with director Spike Lee, he has been nominated for two Academy Awards for composing the scores for Lee's films BlacKkKlansman (2018) and Da 5 Bloods (2020). He has won five Grammy Awards from fourteen nominations.

From 2000 to 2011, Blanchard served as artistic director of the Thelonious Monk Institute of Jazz. In 2011, he was named artistic director of the Henry Mancini Institute at the University of Miami, and in 2015, he became a visiting scholar in jazz composition at the Berklee College of Music. In 2019, the University of California, Los Angeles (UCLA), named Blanchard to its Endowed Chair in Jazz Studies, where he will remain until 2024.

The Metropolitan Opera in New York staged Blanchard's opera Fire Shut Up in My Bones in its 2021–2022 season, the first opera by an African American composer in the organization's history.

Early life 
Blanchard was born in New Orleans, Louisiana, the only child of Wilhelmina and Joseph Oliver Blanchard. His father was a manager at an insurance company and a part-time opera singer. Blanchard began playing piano at the age of five, then the trumpet at age eight after hearing Alvin Alcorn. He played trumpet with his childhood friend Wynton Marsalis in summer music camps, along with his friend Branford Marsalis. For high school, he attended at St. Augustine High School, John F. Kennedy High School, and the New Orleans Center for Creative Arts; at the latter, he studied under Roger Dickerson, his composition teacher and Ellis Marsalis who wanted Blanchard to become a piano player. From 1980 to 1982, he studied under jazz saxophonist Paul Jeffrey and trumpeter Bill Fielder at Rutgers University.

Career 

While studying jazz, Blanchard began touring with the Lionel Hampton Orchestra. In 1982, Wynton Marsalis recommended Blanchard as his replacement in Art Blakey's Jazz Messengers. Blanchard was the band's music director until 1986. He played alongside Blakey, Donald Harrison, and Mulgrew Miller, recording five albums from 1984 to 1988. He and Donald Harrison left Art Blakey in 1986 to form their quintet 'The Terence Blanchard/Donald Harrison Quintet' and signed with CBS Records. He left the Jazz Messengers in 1990 to pursue a solo career.

In the 1990s, after an embouchure change, Blanchard recorded his self-titled debut for Columbia Records which reached No. 3 on the Billboard Jazz chart. After performing on soundtracks for Spike Lee movies, including Do the Right Thing (1989) and Mo' Better Blues (1990), Lee wanted Blanchard to compose the scores for his films beginning with Jungle Fever (1991). Blanchard has written the score for most of Spike Lee's films since, including Malcolm X (1992), Clockers (1995), Summer of Sam (1999), 25th Hour (2002), Inside Man (2006), BlacKkKlansman (2018), and Da 5 Bloods (2020).

Blanchard composed the score for Spike Lee's four-hour Hurricane Katrina documentary for HBO entitled When the Levees Broke: A Requiem in Four Acts (2006). Blanchard appeared in front of the camera with his mother to share their journey back to find her home destroyed. He also created a 2007 album titled A Tale of God's Will (A Requiem for Katrina) in which he recreated some pieces used in the documentary, as well as creating more pieces along with his band, to provide audiences with the opportunity to sympathize with those who had been affected by Hurricane Katrina.

Blanchard has also composed for other directors, including Gina Prince Bythewood, Ron Shelton, and Kasi Lemmons. Entertainment Weekly proclaimed Blanchard "central to a general resurgence of jazz composition for film." In a 1994 interview for DownBeat, Blanchard said: "Writing for film is fun, but nothing can beat being a jazz musician, playing a club, playing a concert".

He has recorded several award-winning albums for Columbia, Sony Classical and Blue Note Records, including In My Solitude: The Billie Holiday Songbook (1994), Romantic Defiance (1995), The Heart Speaks (1996), Wandering Moon (2000), Let's Get Lost (2001) and Flow (2005), which was produced by pianist Herbie Hancock and received two Grammy Award nominations.

Terence Blanchard's 2001 album Let's Get Lost featured arrangements of classic songs written by Jimmy McHugh and performed by his quintet with vocalists Diana Krall, Jane Monheit, Dianne Reeves, and Cassandra Wilson.

In 2005, Blanchard was part of the ensemble that won a Grammy Award for Best Jazz Instrumental Album for his participation on McCoy Tyner's Illuminations, an award he shared with Tyner, Gary Bartz, Christian McBride and Lewis Nash.

Blanchard was a judge for the 5th annual Independent Music Awards to support independent artists' careers. In 2009 in the Disney movie, The Princess and the Frog, Blanchard played all of the alligator Louis' trumpet parts. He also voiced the role of Earl the bandleader in the riverboat band.

Blanchard's opera Fire Shut Up in My Bones with a libretto by Kasi Lemmons had its world premiere at Opera Theatre of St. Louis in 2019, and, on September 27, 2021, had its premiere at the Metropolitan Opera in New York City, opening the company's 2021-22 season. It is the first opera by a black composer in the entire 138 year history of the company.

Print biography
In December 2002, Scarecrow Press published Contemporary Cat: Terence Blanchard with Special Guests, an authorized biography of Blanchard written by Anthony Magro.

Herbie Hancock Institute of Jazz
In the fall of 2000, Terence Blanchard was named artistic director of the Herbie Hancock Institute of Jazz (formerly Thelonious Monk Institute of Jazz) at the University of California Los Angeles. Herbie Hancock serves as chairman; Wayne Shorter, Clark Terry and Jimmy Heath were members of the board of trustees. The conservatory offers an intensive, tuition-free, two-year master's program to a limited number of students (maximum of eight every two years).

In his role as artistic director, Blanchard works with the students in the areas of artistic development, arranging, composition, and career counseling. He also participates in master classes and community outreach activities associated with the program. "Out of my desire to give something back to the jazz community, I wanted to get involved. In fact, I've always said that if I wasn't a musician, that I would like to be a teacher. So I was glad to get involved and to be a part of this unique program that fosters such an open and accessible environment."

In April 2007, the Institute announced its "Commitment to New Orleans" initiative which includes the relocation of the program to the campus of Loyola University New Orleans from Los Angeles. Blanchard had passionately lobbied the Institute to relocate saying, "After Hurricane Katrina, New Orleans was shaken and its musical roots were threatened. I grew up in this city and learned about jazz here at Loyola with other young jazz musicians like Wynton and Branford Marsalis and I know that the Institute will have a great impact on jazz and in our communities. We are going to work hard to help jazz and New Orleans flourish once again."

Other work

In 2007, the Monterey Jazz Festival named Blanchard Artist-In-Residence, citing him as "one his generation’s most artistically mature and innovative artists and a committed supporter of jazz education." The Monterey Jazz Festival 50th Anniversary Band featuring Blanchard on trumpet will make a 54-date, 10-week tour of the United States from January 8, 2008, to March 16, 2008. Rounding out the band will be saxophonist James Moody, pianist Benny Green, bassist Derrick Hodge and drummer Kendrick Scott. The special ensemble will also feature jazz singer Nnenna Freelon.

In December 2007, the Terence Blanchard Quintet performed the movie music of Spike Lee and Terence Blanchard with an orchestra and singers Dee Dee Bridgewater, Kurt Elling, and Raul Midón at the John F. Kennedy Center for the Performing Arts in Washington, D.C.

In November 2008, he was a guest on Private Passions, the biographical music discussion programme on BBC Radio 3.

On February 10, 2008, Blanchard won his first Grammy Award as a bandleader for A Tale of God's Will (A Requiem for Katrina) in the category of Best Large Jazz Ensemble Album. His two other Grammy Awards were as a sideman for Art Blakey (1984) and McCoy Tyner (2004).

Blanchard composed original music for Stephen Adly Guirgis's Broadway play The Motherfucker With the Hat, which premiered at the Gerald Schoenfeld Theatre on April 11, 2011. The show is described as "a high-octane verbal cage match about love, fidelity and misplaced haberdashery."

On January 20, 2012, the film  Red Tails was released nationwide in the United States. Blanchard served as the composer of the original score, marking the first time he has worked with executive producer George Lucas.

He composed incidental music for the 2012 Broadway revival of A Streetcar Named Desire.

He released Magnetic May 28, 2013, on Blue Note Records.

Blanchard's album, Breathless, with his new band, The E-Collective, was released by Blue Note Records on May 26, 2015. Featuring Maroon 5's PJ Morton on three cuts, and JRei Oliver, Terence's son, on spoken word, the core band consists of Fabian Almazan on keyboards, Charles Altura on guitar, Donald Ramsey on bass, and Oscar Seaton on drums. Cuepoint, on the web publishing site, Medium, published Blanchard's essay, "Using Music to Underscore Three Words: I Can't Breathe" which details Blanchard's revulsion by the death of Eric Garner and how the subsequent "I Can't Breathe" campaign inspired the series of songs the E-Collective created for the album.

On November 9, 2019, Blanchard performed alongside Lady Gaga as a special guest during her Jazz and Piano show in Las Vegas, Nevada.

Operas
On June 15, 2013, after a workshop with Opera Fusion: New Works, Blanchard premiered his first opera, Champion, at the Opera Theatre of Saint Louis. It is about the life of prize fighting boxer Emile Griffith from St. Thomas, with a libretto by Pulitzer Prize-winning Michael Cristofer. It starred Denyce Graves, Aubrey Allicock, Robert Orth, and Arthur Woodley.

On June 15, 2019, Blanchard's second opera, Fire Shut Up in My Bones, with a libretto by Kasi Lemmons, was premiered by the Opera Theatre of Saint Louis. The opera, based on the 2014 memoir of the same title by Charles Blow, was expanded with added dance sequences and a larger role for the part of Billie, Charles's mother, and opened the Metropolitan Opera's 2021-2022 season. It will close the Lyric Opera of Chicago’s 2021-2022 mainstage opera season. Blanchard is the first Black composer to have an opera performed at the Metropolitan Opera.

Awards and honors

Academy Awards

British Academy Film Awards

Golden Globe Awards

Grammy Awards

Primetime Emmy Awards

Miscellaneous Awards

Discography

As leader 
A complete discography of Blanchard's jazz recordings as a bandleader.

As sideman
With Art Blakey
 Oh-By the Way (Timeless, 1982)
 New York Scene (Concord, 1984) – live
 Blue Night (Timeless, 1985)

With Cedar Walton
 1990: As Long as There's Music (Muse, 1993)
 1997: Roots (Astor Place, 1997)

With others
 Joanne Brackeen, Fi-Fi Goes to Heaven (Concord Jazz, 1987) – rec. 1986
 Terri Lyne Carrington, Jazz Is a Spirit (ACT, 2002) – rec. 2001
 Kenny Drew Jr., The Rainbow Connection (Evidence, 1988)
 Robert Glasper, Double-Booked (Blue Note, 2009) – voice in 1 track
 Benny Green, Prelude (Criss Cross Jazz, 1988)
 Ralph Moore, Images (Landmark, 1989) – rec. 1988
 Gregory Porter, Nat King Cole & Me (Blue Note, 2017) – 2 tracks

Filmography
A selected filmography of Terence Blanchard scores.

References

Further reading
 Magro, Anthony. Contemporary Cat: Terence Blanchard with Special Guests, Scarecrow Press (2002) – 
 Yanow, Scott. Trumpet Kings: The Players Who Shaped the Sound of Jazz Trumpet, Backbeat Books (2002) –

External links 

 
 Terence Blanchard's official website
 Terence Blanchard interview by Pete Lewis, 'Blues & Soul' November 2009
 Magro, Anthony. "Contemporary Cat: Terence Blanchard with Special Guests", Scarecrow Press (2002)
 [ Billboard Chart History for Terence Blanchard]
 Interview with Terence Blanchard
Terrence Blanchard Terrence Blanchard MusiCodex Page
Terence Blanchard Interview NAMM Oral History Library (2015)

1962 births
African-American composers
African-American conductors (music)
African-American film score composers
African-American jazz composers
African-American male composers
African-American music educators
African-American opera composers
American film score composers
American jazz bandleaders
American jazz composers
American jazz educators
American jazz trumpeters
American male conductors (music)
American male jazz composers
American male jazz musicians
American male film score composers
American male trumpeters
American opera composers
American television composers
Blue Note Records artists
Columbia Records artists
Educators from Louisiana
Grammy Award winners
Hard bop trumpeters
Jazz arrangers
Jazz musicians from New Orleans
Living people
Mainstream jazz trumpeters
Male opera composers
Male television composers
Modal jazz trumpeters
Post-bop arrangers
Post-bop composers
Post-bop trumpeters
The Jazz Messengers members
Varèse Sarabande Records artists